Wilier Triestina is an Italian manufacturer of racing bicycles, founded in 1906 by Pietro Dal Molin in Bassano del Grappa, Italy. They are now based in Rossano Veneto, Italy.

History 

Wilier Triestina started in a modest workshop on the banks of the river Brenta in San Fortunato by Pietro Dal Molin from Bassano del Grappa, Italy, in the summer of 1906.

The company name originated as an acronym for the phrase “W l’Italia liberata e redenta”, where the W is an abbreviation for "Viva!" (Long live Italy, liberated and redeemed). Triestina comes from the name of the city of Trieste. When Wilier was founded, Trieste was not part of Italy; the name 'Wilier Triestina' reflected a patriotic desire for it to be rejoined.

The famous Italian cyclist Fiorenzo Magni rode Wilier bikes in his 1948 Giro d'Italia win as well as his 1949 and 1950 Tour of Flanders wins.

Marco Pantani rode the 1997 Tour de France on a Wilier.

More recently World Champion Alessandro Ballan and runner up Damiano Cunego rode Wilier bicycles to victory in the 2008 UCI Road World Championships.

Since the 2018 season, Wilier Triestina supplies bikes to the UCI Pro Continental team Direct Énergie and since 2020 Astana Pro Team.

See also

 List of bicycle parts
 List of Italian companies

References

External links

 Official website

Vehicle manufacturing companies established in 1906
Italian companies established in 1906
Italian brands
Cycle manufacturers of Italy
Electric bicycles
Companies based in Veneto
Mountain bike manufacturers
Sporting goods manufacturers of Italy